Yunti (10 February 1688 – 16 February 1755), born Yinzhen and also known as Yinti before 1722, formally known as Prince Xun, was a Manchu prince and military general of the Qing dynasty.

Life

Kangxi era
Yunti was born "Yinzhen" in the Aisin Gioro clan as the 14th son of the Kangxi Emperor. His mother was Empress Xiaogongren, who also bore the Yongzheng Emperor. As Yunti's birth name "Yinzhen" was similar to that of his fourth brother, Yinzhen (胤禛), it was changed to "Yinti" (胤禵).

In 1709, Yinti was granted the title of a beizi. In 1718, after Dzungar forces defeated a Qing army along the Salween River in Tibet, the Kangxi Emperor appointed Yinti as "Great General Who Pacifies the Frontier" (撫遠大將軍) to lead an army of 300,000 into Tibet to attack the Dzungars and their leader, Tsewang Rabtan. It was believed that this was a sign that the Kangxi Emperor was considering Yinti as a potential heir to his throne. In February 1720, Yinti ordered his deputies Galbi and Yanxin to set out from Xining to take Lhasa, while he remained in Xining to build up support with their Mongol allies and then escort the Seventh Dalai Lama to Lhasa. On 24 September 1720, Yinti's army captured Lhasa and returned the Dalai Lama to the Potala Palace.

Yongzheng era
On 21 December 1722, just as Yinti was planning for a conquest of the Dzungar Khanate, he received news of the Kangxi Emperor's death and was immediately summoned back to the capital, Beijing, to attend his father's funeral. His fourth brother, Yinzhen, succeeded their father and became historically known as the Yongzheng Emperor. Yinti and his brothers had to change the character Yin (胤) in their names to Yun (允) to avoid naming taboo, because the reigning emperor's personal name contained the character Yin.

In 1723, Yunti was promoted from beizi to junwang (second-rank prince). However, in the following year, he was demoted back to beizi. The Yongzheng Emperor perceived Yunti as a potential threat to his throne, so he stripped Yunti of his beizi title in 1725 and placed him under house arrest at Shouhuang Palace, in the present-day Jingshan Park.

Qianlong era
In 1735, the Yongzheng Emperor died and was succeeded by his fourth son Hongli, who became historically known as the Qianlong Emperor. The Qianlong Emperor released Yunti in the same year after his coronation. In 1737, Yunti was restored to the ranks of nobility as a fuguo gong (a lesser duke). Ten years later, in 1747, he was promoted to beile. In 1748, he was further promoted back to junwang and granted the title "Prince Xun of the Second Rank" (恂郡王).

Yunti died on 16 February 1755 and was posthumously honoured as Prince Xunqin of the Second Rank (恂勤郡王). The Prince Xun peerage was inherited by his second son, Hongming (弘明; 1705–1767), who became a beile in 1735.

Family 
Primary Consort

 Princess Consort Xunqin, of the Wanyan clan (恂勤郡王福晋 完顏氏)Titles: Primary Consort of the Fourteenth Prince (第十四王子福晋) → Princess Consort of the Fourth Rank (贝子夫人) → Princess Consort of the Second Rank (郡王福晋) → Princess Consort of the Fourth Rank (贝子夫人) → Primary Consort of the Fourteenth Son of the Kangxi Emperor (第十四儿子福晋) → Duchess of the Second Rank (不入八分国公夫人)→ Princess Consort of the Third Rank (贝勒夫人) → Princess Consort Xun of the Second Rank (恂郡王福晋) → Princess Consort Xunqin of the Second Rank (恂勤郡王福晋)
 Hongming, Prince Gongqin of the Third Rank (恭勤贝勒 弘明; 25 April 1705 – 4 February 1767), second son
 Hongkai (弘暟; 31 December 1707 – 28 January 1759), fourth son

Secondary Consort

 Secondary consort, of the Šušu Gioro clan (側福晉 舒舒覺羅氏)Titles: Secondary Consort of the Fourteenth Prince (第十四皇子侧妃) → Side Consort of a Beizi (貝子侧妃) → Secondary Consort of a Junwang (郡王侧福晋) → Side Consort of the Fourteenth Son of the Kangxi Emperor (第十四儿子侧妃) → Side Consort of a Duke (不入八分国公侧妃) → Side Consort of a Beile (贝勒侧妃) → Secondary Consort of Xun Junwang (恂郡王侧福晋) → Secondary Consort Xunqin of the Second Rank (恂勤郡王侧福晋)
 Hongchun, Prince Tai of the Second Rank (泰郡王 弘春; 11 October 1703 – 3 March 1739), first son
 Princess of the Third Rank (郡主; 5 December 1705 – 1 March 1729), second daughter
 Married Chenggunjab (成衮扎布) of the Harqin league on 10 February 1719
 Married Senggunzabu (僧衮紮布) in 1719
 Lady of the Second Rank (縣君; 22 June 1706 – 10 June 1761), third daughter
 Married Halu of the Namdulu clan in December 1727
 Princess of the Third Rank (郡主; 8 August 1707 – 4 October 1776), fifth daughter
 Secondary consort, of the Irgen Gioro clan (側福晉 伊爾根覺羅氏)Titles: Secondary Consort of the Fourteenth Prince (第十四皇子侧妃) → Side Consort of a Beizi (貝子侧妃) → Secondary Consort of a Junwang (郡王侧福晋) → Side Consort of the Fourteenth Son of the Kangxi Emperor (第十四儿子侧妃) → Side Consort of a Duke (不入八分国公侧妃) → Side Consort of a Beile (贝勒侧妃) → Secondary Consort of Xun Junwang (恂郡王侧福晋) → Secondary Consort Xunqin of the Second Rank (恂勤郡王侧福晋)
 First daughter (20 February 1705 – March/April 1706)
 Princess of the Second Rank (縣君; 17 November 1706 – 16 February 1773), fourth daughter
 Married Deshou (德绶) of the Aohan Borjigin clan
 Hongying (弘映; 12 December 1707 – 29 August 1771), third son

Concubine

 Mistress, of the Wu clan (吳氏)Titles: Mistress of a Duke (不入八分国公格格) → Concubine of a Beile (贝勒庶妃)→ Concubine of Xun Junwang (恂郡王庶妃) → Concubine of Prince Xunqin of the Second Rank (恂勤郡王庶妃)
 Sixth daughter (22 February 1737 – 21 September 1741)
 Mistress, of the Irgen Gioro clan (伊爾根覺羅氏)Titles: Concubine of Xun Junwang (恂郡王庶妃) → Concubine of Prince Xunqin of the Second Rank (恂勤郡王庶妃)
 Princess of the Fourth Rank (縣主; 30 October 1753 – 10 April 1776), seventh daughter
 Married Erdengge of the Niohuru clan in December 1767

Ancestry

In fiction and popular culture
 Portrayed by Cheung Wai in The Rise and Fall of Qing Dynasty (1988)
 Portrayed by Huang Yinxun in Legend of YungChing (1997)
 Portrayed by Xu Zuming in Yongzheng Dynasty (1999)
 Portrayed by Derek Kwok in The King of Yesterday and Tomorrow (2003)
 Portrayed by Chen Zhihui in Huang Taizi Mishi (2004)
 Portrayed by Mao Zijun in Palace (2011)
 Portrayed by Lin Gengxin in Scarlet Heart (2011)
 Portrayed by Wei Qianxiang in Palace II (2012)
 Portrayed by Owen Cheung in Gilded Chopsticks (2014)
Portrayed by Xin Yun Lai in Dreaming Back to the Qing Dynasty (2019)

See also
 Prince Xun (恂)
 Royal and noble ranks of the Qing dynasty
 Ranks of imperial consorts in China#Qing

References

External links
  The Yongzheng Emperor's mystery succession and Yinti's involvement

1688 births
1755 deaths
Kangxi Emperor's sons
Manchu politicians
Qing dynasty generals
Qing dynasty politicians from Beijing
Generals from Beijing
Prince Xun (恂)